Legislative elections were held in Åland on 15 June 1954.

Results

References

Elections in Åland
Aland
1954 in Finland